In representation theory and algebraic number theory, the Langlands program is a web of far-reaching and influential conjectures about connections between number theory and geometry. Widely seen as the single biggest project in modern mathematical research, the Langlands program has been described by Edward Frenkel as "a kind of grand unified theory of mathematics."

The Langlands program consists of some very complicated theoretical abstractions, which can be difficult even for specialist mathematicians to grasp. To oversimplify, the fundamental lemma of the project posits a direct connection between the generalized fundamental representation of a finite field with its group extension to the automorphic forms under which it is invariant. This is accomplished through abstraction to higher dimensional integration, by an equivalence to a certain analytical group as an absolute extension of its algebra. Consequently, this allows an analytical functional construction of powerful invariance transformations for a number field to its own algebraic structure.

The meaning of such a construction is nuanced, but its specific solutions and generalizations are very powerful. The consequence for proof of existence to such theoretical objects implies an analytical method in constructing the categoric mapping of fundamental structures for virtually any number field. As an analogue to the possible exact distribution of primes, the Langlands program allows a potential general tool for the resolution of invariance at the level of generalized algebraic structures. This in turn permits a somewhat unified analysis of arithmetic objects through their automorphic functions. Simply put, the Langlands philosophy allows a general analysis of structuring the abstractions of numbers. Naturally, this description is at once a reduction and over-generalization of the program's proper theorems, but these mathematical analogues provide the basis of its conceptualization.

Background

What initially was very new in Langlands' work, besides technical depth, was the proposed direct connection to number theory, together with the rich organisational structure hypothesised (so-called functoriality).

For example, in the work of Harish-Chandra one finds the principle that what can be done for one semisimple (or reductive) Lie group, should be done for all. Therefore, once the role of some low-dimensional Lie groups such as GL(2) in the theory of modular forms had been recognised, and with hindsight GL(1) in class field theory, the way was open at least to speculation about GL(n) for general n > 2.

The cusp form idea came out of the cusps on modular curves but also had a meaning visible in spectral theory as "discrete spectrum", contrasted with the "continuous spectrum" from Eisenstein series. It becomes much more technical for bigger Lie groups, because the parabolic subgroups are more numerous.

In all these approaches there was no shortage of technical methods, often inductive in nature and based on Levi decompositions amongst other matters, but the field wasand isvery demanding.

And on the side of modular forms, there were examples such as Hilbert modular forms, Siegel modular forms, and theta-series.

Objects
There are a number of related Langlands conjectures. There are many different groups over many different fields for which they can be stated, and for each field there are several different versions of the conjectures. Some versions of the Langlands conjectures are vague, or depend on objects such as the Langlands groups, whose existence is unproven, or on the L-group that has several inequivalent definitions. Moreover, the Langlands conjectures have evolved since Langlands first stated them in 1967.

There are different types of objects for which the Langlands conjectures can be stated:
Representations of reductive groups over local fields (with different subcases corresponding to archimedean local fields, p-adic local fields, and completions of function fields)
Automorphic forms on reductive groups over global fields (with subcases corresponding to number fields or function fields).
Finite fields. Langlands did not originally consider this case, but his conjectures have analogues for it.
More general fields, such as function fields over the complex numbers.

Conjectures

There are several different ways of stating the Langlands conjectures, which are closely related but not obviously equivalent.

Reciprocity
The starting point of the program may be seen as Emil Artin's reciprocity law, which generalizes quadratic reciprocity. The Artin reciprocity law applies to a Galois extension of an algebraic number field whose Galois group is abelian; it assigns L-functions to the one-dimensional representations of this Galois group, and states that these L-functions are identical to certain Dirichlet L-series or more general series (that is, certain analogues of the Riemann zeta function) constructed from Hecke characters. The precise correspondence between these different kinds of L-functions constitutes Artin's reciprocity law.

For non-abelian Galois groups and higher-dimensional representations of them, one can still define L-functions in a natural way: Artin L-functions.

The insight of Langlands was to find the proper generalization of Dirichlet L-functions, which would allow the formulation of Artin's statement in this more general setting. (This ring simultaneously keeps track of all the completions of  see p-adic numbers.)

Langlands attached automorphic L-functions to these automorphic representations, and conjectured that every Artin L-function arising from a finite-dimensional representation of the Galois group of a number field is equal to one arising from an automorphic cuspidal representation. This is known as his "reciprocity conjecture".

Roughly speaking, the reciprocity conjecture gives a correspondence between automorphic representations of a reductive group and homomorphisms from a Langlands group to an L-group. There are numerous variations of this, in part because the definitions of Langlands group and L-group are not fixed.

Over local fields this is expected to give a parameterization of L-packets of admissible irreducible representations of a reductive group over the local field. For example, over the real numbers, this correspondence is the Langlands classification of representations of real reductive groups. Over global fields, it should give a parameterization of automorphic forms.

Functoriality

The functoriality conjecture states that a suitable homomorphism of L-groups is expected to give a correspondence between automorphic forms (in the global case) or representations (in the local case). Roughly speaking, the Langlands reciprocity conjecture is the special case of the functoriality conjecture when one of the reductive groups is trivial.

Generalized functoriality
Langlands generalized the idea of functoriality: instead of using the general linear group GL(n), other connected reductive groups can be used. Furthermore, given such a group G, Langlands constructs the Langlands dual group LG, and then, for every automorphic cuspidal representation of G and every finite-dimensional representation of LG, he defines an L-function. One of his conjectures states that these L-functions satisfy a certain functional equation generalizing those of other known L-functions.

He then goes on to formulate a very general "Functoriality Principle". Given two reductive groups and a (well behaved) morphism between their corresponding L-groups, this conjecture relates their automorphic representations in a way that is compatible with their L-functions. This functoriality conjecture implies all the other conjectures presented so far. It is of the nature of an induced representation construction—what in the more traditional theory of automorphic forms had been called a 'lifting', known in special cases, and so is covariant (whereas a restricted representation is contravariant). Attempts to specify a direct construction have only produced some conditional results.

All these conjectures can be formulated for more general fields in place of : algebraic number fields (the original and most important case), local fields, and function fields (finite extensions of Fp(t) where p is a prime and Fp(t) is the field of rational functions over the finite field with p elements).

Geometric conjectures

The so-called geometric Langlands program, suggested by Gérard Laumon following ideas of Vladimir Drinfeld, arises from a geometric reformulation of the usual Langlands program that attempts to relate more than just irreducible representations. In simple cases, it relates -adic representations of the étale fundamental group of an algebraic curve to objects of the derived category  of -adic sheaves on the moduli stack of vector bundles over the curve.

Current status
The Langlands conjectures for GL(1, K) follow from (and are essentially equivalent to)   class field theory.

Lusztig's classification of the irreducible representations of groups of Lie type over finite fields can be considered an analogue of the Langlands conjectures for finite fields.

Andrew Wiles' proof of modularity of semistable elliptic curves over rationals can be viewed as an instance of the Langlands reciprocity conjecture, since the main idea is to relate the Galois representations arising from elliptic curves to modular forms.  Although Wiles' results have been substantially generalized, in many different directions, the full Langlands conjecture for  remains unproved.

In 1998, Laurent Lafforgue proved Lafforgue's theorem verifying the Langlands conjectures for the general linear group GL(n, K) for function fields K. This work continued earlier investigations by Drinfeld, who proved the case GL(2, K) in the 1980s.

In 2018, Vincent Lafforgue established the global Langlands correspondence (the direction from automorphic forms to Galois representations) for connected reductive groups over global function fields.

Local Langlands conjectures

 proved the local Langlands conjectures for the general linear group GL(2, K) over local fields.

 proved the local Langlands conjectures  for the general linear group GL(n, K) for positive characteristic local fields K. Their proof uses a global argument.

 proved the local Langlands conjectures for the general linear group GL(n, K) for characteristic 0 local fields K.  gave another proof. Both proofs use a global argument.  gave another proof.

Fundamental lemma

In 2008, Ngô Bảo Châu proved the "fundamental lemma", which was originally conjectured by Langlands and Shelstad in 1983 and being required in the proof of some important conjectures in the Langlands program.

Implications
To a lay reader or even nonspecialist mathematician, abstractions within the Langlands program can be somewhat impenetrable. However, there are some strong and clear implications for proof or disproof of the fundamental Langlands conjectures. 

As the program posits a powerful connection between analytic number theory and generalizations of algebraic geometry, the idea of 'functoriality' between abstract algebraic representations of number fields and their analytical prime constructions results in powerful functional tools allowing an exact quantification of prime distributions. This, in turn, yields the capacity for classification of diophantine equations and further abstractions of algebraic functions.
 
Furthermore, if the reciprocity of such generalized algebras for the posited objects exists, and if their analytical functions can be shown to be well-defined, some very deep results in mathematics could be within reach of proof. Examples include: rational solutions of elliptic curves, topological construction of algebraic varieties, and the famous Riemann hypothesis. Such proofs would be expected to utilize abstract solutions in objects of generalized analytical series, each of which relates to the invariance within structures of number fields. 

Additionally, some connections between the Langlands program and M theory have been posited, as their dualities connect in nontrivial ways, providing potential exact solutions in superstring theory (as was similarly done in group theory through monstrous moonshine).

Simply put, the Langlands project implies a deep and powerful framework of solutions, which touches the most fundamental areas of mathematics, through high-order generalizations in exact solutions of algebraic equations, with analytical functions, as embedded in geometric forms. It allows a unification of many distant mathematical fields into a formalism of powerful analytical methods.

See also
Jacquet–Langlands correspondence
Erlangen program

Notes

References

External links

The work of Robert Langlands 

 
Zeta and L-functions
Representation theory of Lie groups
Automorphic forms
Conjectures
History of mathematics